Hortobágy is an 800 km2 national park in eastern Hungary, rich with folklore and cultural history. The park, a part of the Alföld (Great Plain), was designated as a national park in 1973 (the first in Hungary), and elected among the World Heritage sites in 1999. The Hortobágy is Hungary's largest protected area, and the largest semi-natural grassland in Europe.

Until recently it was believed that this alkaline steppe was formed by the clear cutting of huge forests in the Middle Ages, followed by measures to control the course of the Tisza River, allegedly resulting in the soil's current structure and pH. However, Hortobágy is much older, with alkalinization estimated to have started ten thousand years ago, when the Tisza first found its way through the Great Hungarian Plain, cutting off many streams from their sources in the Northern Mountains. The formation was finished by grazing animals and wild horses during the Ice Age, followed by domesticated animals.

One of its most iconic sites is the Nine-holed Bridge.  Traditional T-shaped sweep wells dot the landscape, as well as the occasional mirage of trees shimmering in the reflected heat of the puszta (steppe). Part of the national park is a dark sky preserve.

Hortobágy has also had more negative connotations, as a site of forced labor under the communist regime.

Flora and fauna
Hortobágy is a steppe, a grassy plain with Hungarian Grey cattle, racka, water buffalo, and horses tended by mounted herdsmen called Csikós. It provides habitat for various species including 342 species of birds. The red-footed falcon, stone curlew, great bustard and European roller are represented by breeding populations.
The area is an important stopover site for migrating common cranes, dotterels, and lesser white-fronted geese.

Hortobágy is also a center for the breeding of Taurus cattle, one of several attempts to re-create the extinct aurochs.

Gallery

See also
National symbols of Hungary

References

Further reading 

 Gorman, Gerard (1996): The Birds of Hungary. Helm (A&C Black) London, UK. .

National parks of Hungary
Biosphere reserves of Hungary
World Heritage Sites in Hungary
Protected areas established in 1973
Historical regions in Hungary
Birdwatching sites in Hungary
Tourist attractions in Hajdú-Bihar County
1973 establishments in Hungary
Ramsar sites in Hungary